Robert Parker is a Swedish electronic musician from Stockholm, known for his synthwave works.

Making tracker music during the 1990s, he started making retro music in 2009 after buying a Korg Polysix analog synthesizer, and uses a variety of hardware synthesizers in his music like the Roland Juno 106 and the Moog Minimoog.

Composing
His style takes elements from 1980s music and movies, as well as from French house and disco. In 2013 he released his debut album Drive. Sweat. Play followed by the EP Modern Moves on Future City Records. In 2015 he released the EP  Cardinal and the album Money Talks. In 2016 he released the vinyl Crystal City on NewRetroWave Records collaborating with Maethelvin from the Valerie collective In 2017 he released the EP "Awakening" on Lazerdisc records, also appearing on the Lakeshore Records 2018 soundtrack release to the motion picture "Videoman".  

Parker featured in the 2019 documentary film The Rise of the Synths which explored the origins and growth of the Synthwave genre, appearing alongside various other composers from the scene, including John Carpenter who also starred in and narrated the film.  Parker also appeared on the film's soundtrack compilation "The Rise Of The Synths",also released on Lakeshore Records.

Discography

Singles
Highway Star (2013)
Modern Technology (2014, with Waveshaper)
Brooklyn Bridge (2014)
Interstellar Traveller (2014)
Brave New World (2014)
Carry the Beat (feat. Charlotte Savary) (Robert Parker Remix) (2015)
Fashion Funk (2015)
SHOOTER (2015)
Love Lost (2015)
 Race To Paris (2016, Lazerdiscs Records)
Love Theme (2016, with Maethelvin)
Silver Shadow (2017, Lakeshore Records)

Albums
 Drive. Sweat. Play. (2013, Self Released)
 Modern Moves (2014, Future City Records)
 Cardinal (2015, Telefuture Records)
 Money Talks (2015, Self Released)
 Crystal City (2016, NRW Records)
Awakening (2017, Lazerdiscs Records)
Videoman (Original Motion Picture Soundtrack) (2018, Lakeshore Records)
End of the Night (2018, NRW Records)
Club 707 (2020, Electronic Purification Records)

Compilations
The Singles 2013-2015 (2015, Self Released)
The Rise Of The Synths Companion Album (2017, Lakeshore Records)

References

External links
Official YouTube channel
Official Bandcamp page

Synthwave musicians
Swedish electronic musicians
Living people
Date of birth missing (living people)
Musicians from Stockholm
Year of birth missing (living people)